The Poland men's national under-18 ice hockey team is the men's national under-18 ice hockey team of Poland. The team is controlled by the Polish Ice Hockey Federation, a member of the International Ice Hockey Federation. The team represents Poland at the IIHF World U18 Championships.

International competitions

IIHF World U18 Championships

External links
Poland at IIHF.com

Ice hockey in Poland
National under-18 ice hockey teams
Ice hockey